was a district located in Okayama Prefecture, Japan.

As of 2003, the district had an estimated population of 39,365 and a density of 313.64 persons per km2. The total area was 125.51 km2.

Towns and villages
 Oku
 Osafune
 Ushimado

Merger
 On November 1, 2004 - the towns of Oku, Osafune and Ushimado were merged to create the city of Setouchi.

Former districts of Okayama Prefecture